Allegra was a four-issue limited series published by WildStorm in association with Image Comics in 1996. It was written by Steven T. Seagle, and illustrated by Scott Clark and various others, including Chris Carlston.

References
 Allegra @ comicbookdb

WildStorm titles
Wildstorm Universe superheroes